Satzung is a village in the Saxon municipality of Marienberg, which is in the district of Erzgebirgskreis in the German Ore Mountains.

Geography 
Satzung lies about 12 kilometres south of Marienberg in the Ore Mountains on the German-Czech border. Dense forests separate the village on both the German and Czech sides from its neighbours. Only the field clearings of the abandoned village of Jilmová in the east border immediately on those of Satzung. About 1 kilometre north of the village centre lies the 890-metre-high Hirtstein, some 4 kilometres south-southwest, on Czech territory, lies the 993-metre-high Jelení hora (Haßberg). The Black Pockau river flows eastwards here, marking the state border. The K 8104 district road (Kreisstraße) runs through the village, joining the Staatsstraße 216 running northward from Reitzenhain to Olbernhau.

Population development

Personalities 
 Luise Pinc, Ore Mountain dialect poet and singer.
 Erich Lang, regional poet
 Horst Heidrich, Forester General (Generalforstmeister) of the GDR and Deputy Minister for State Economy, Forestry and Food Commodities

Literature 
 
 Die Parochie Satzung. in: Neue Sächsische Kirchengalerie, Ephorie Marienberg. Strauch Verlag, Leipzig, pp. 672–688 (digitalised)
 Landratsamt Mittlerer Erzgebirgskreis, Hrsg.: Zur Geschichte der Städte und Gemeinden im Mittleren Erzgebirgskreis, Eine Zeittafel (parts 1-3)

External links 
 
 satzung-erzgebirge.de
 Evangelical-Lutheran parish of Satzung

References 

Marienberg
Former municipalities in Saxony